Lakeside or Lake Side may refer to:

Places

Australia
 Lakeside College, Pakenham, Victoria
 Lakeside Joondalup Shopping City, Joondalup, Western Australia
 Lakeside, near Reservoir, Victoria
 Lakeside International Raceway, Pine Rivers, Queensland
 Lakeside Mental Hospital, formerly known as Ballarat Lunatic Asylum, Ballarat, Victoria
 Lakeside railway station, Melbourne, on the Puffing Billy Railway
 Lakeside, Queensland, a locality in the North Burnett Region

Canada
 Lakeside, Nova Scotia, just outside Halifax
 Lakeside, New Brunswick
 Lakeside, Kenora District, Ontario
 Lakeside, Oxford County, Ontario
 Lakeside (electoral district), a political district
 Rural Municipality of Lakeside No. 338, Saskatchewan, a rural municipality

Malaysia
 Lakeside Campus, Taylor's University, Subang Jaya

New Zealand
 Lakeside, New Zealand, a locality in Selwyn District

Singapore
 Lakeside MRT station, an above-ground Mass Rapid Transit station on the East West MRT line in Jurong West

South Africa
 Lakeside, Johannesburg

United Kingdom
 Lakeside, Cardiff, near Cyncoed, Wales
 Lakeside, Cumbria, at the southern end of Windermere, England
 Lakeside, Llanelli, Wales
 Lakeside, Worcestershire, England
 Lakeside Arts Centre, part of the Force Majeure comedy tour, Nottingham, England
 Lakeside Leisure Complex, Frimley Green, Surrey, host of the BDO World Darts Championship
 Lakeside Shopping Centre, Thurrock

United States

 Lakeside, Arizona
 Lakeside Lake, Tucson, Arizona
 Lakeside, Arkansas
 Lakeside, California, an unincorporated suburb of San Diego
 Lakeside, California, former name of Stateline, California
 Lakeside, Connecticut
 Lakeside, Colorado
 Lakeside, Florida
 Lakeside, Georgia
 Lakeside, Indiana
 Lakeside, Iowa
 Lakeside (Batchelor, Louisiana), listed on the NRHP in Pointe Coupee Parish, Louisiana
 Lakeside, Shreveport, Louisiana
 Lakeside, Berrien County, Michigan
 Lakeside, Genesee County, Michigan
 Lakeside, Macomb County, Michigan
 Lakeside – Lester Park (Duluth), Minnesota
 Lakeside, Minnesota
 Lakeside Township, Minnesota (disambiguation), multiple locations
 Lakeside, Missouri
 Lakeside, Montana
 Lakeside, Nebraska
 Lakeside, Ohio
 Lakeside, Oregon
 Lakeside, San Patricio County, Texas
 Lakeside, Tarrant County, Texas
 Lakeside, Virginia
 Lakeside, Washington
 Lakeside, Wisconsin
 Lakeside Amusement Park, a family-owned amusement park in Lakeside, Colorado
 Lakeside Amusement Park (Virginia), a defunct amusement park
 Lakeside Drive, Washoe County, Nevada
 Lakeside Inn (Lakeside, Michigan), a historic hotel
 Lakeside Mall, Sterling Heights, Michigan
 Lakeside Mountains, Utah
 Lakeside Lake, Tucson, Arizona
 Lakeside Park (Owasco, New York), a historic "pleasure ground" park
 Lake Side Power Station, Vineyard, Utah
 Lake-Side Terrace Apartments, Chicago, Illinois

Other uses
 Lakeside (band), a funk band
 Lakeside (album), a 1977 album by the band
 Lakeside Hammers, a speedway team who race in the British National League
 Lakeside Murders, a Finnish crime drama television series
 Lakeside Press, a Chicago publishing imprint under which the RR Donnelley Company
 Lakeside Press Building, a historic commercial building in downtown Chicago, Illinois
 Lakeside Records, the name of at least two different record companies
 Lakeside Singers, a Chicago area ensemble

See also 
 Lake side road or esplanade
 Lakeside Academy (disambiguation)
 Lakeside Cemetery (disambiguation)
 Lakeside Country Club (disambiguation)
 Lakeside Elementary School (disambiguation)
 Lakeside Garden (disambiguation)
 Lakeside Golf Course (disambiguation)
 Lakeside High School (disambiguation)
 Lakeside Inn (disambiguation)
 Lakeside Park (disambiguation)
 Lakeside School (disambiguation)
 Lakeside School District (disambiguation)
 Lakeside station (disambiguation)
 Lakeside Village (disambiguation)